Gualtherus Carel Jacob Vosmaer (Oud-Beijerland, August 19, 1854 - Leiden, September 23, 1916 ) was a Dutch zoologist.

Biography 
GCJ Vosmaer was born in 1854 in Oud-Beijerland, where his father, the poet and critic Carel Vosmaer was then a clerk at the subdistrict court. He studied in The Hague and subsequently at the University of Leiden, where he obtained his doctorate in 1880 with a thesis on sponges ("Leucandra aspera and the Canal System of Sponges"). In 1882 he became Anton Dohrn's assistant at his zoological station in Naples. In 1889 he returned to the Netherlands and became assistant to Professor Ambrosius Hubrecht in Utrecht. Later he became a private teacher and lecturer in Utrecht and in 1904 he became professor of zoology in Leiden.

Work 
Vosmaer was a specialist in the field of sponges, describing many species. In Naples he examined the sponges in the Bay of Naples.  He also described the sponges collected during the Willem Barents expedition to the North Atlantic and Arctic Ocean in 1880-1881  and during the Siboga expedition of 1899-1900.

The genus Vosmaeropsis Dendy, 1893, is named for him.

References 

1854 births
1916 deaths
19th-century Dutch zoologists
Spongiologists
20th-century Dutch zoologists